Kairi — Rishta Khatta Meetha (English: A Sweet Sour Relationship Like An Unripe Mango) is an Indian soap opera which was aired on Colors TV and was based on the dictatorship of a mother-in-law. It started airing on 2 April 2012 and concluded due to low ratings on 14 December 2012.

Later, it was dubbed in Tamil as 'Neelambari' on Makkal TV.

Cast
 Preeti Choudary – Ambika Anuj Shrivastav a.k.a. Ambi
 Jay Bhanushali / Naman Shaw – Anuj Ashok Shrivastav
 Saurabh Dubey – Ashok Shrivastav
 Hema Singh – Imarti Ashok Shrivastav
 Abhinav Kohli – Prakash Ashok Shrivastav
 Dipti Dhyani – Kusum Prakash Shrivastav
 Meet Mukhi – Sonu Prakash Shrivastav
 Bharat Kumwali – Ved Ashok Shrivastav
 Roshani Shetty – Sajni Ved Shrivastav a.k.a. Lalli Lipstick
 Naman Shaw – Abhay Ashok Shrivastav(DEAD)
 Vibha Anand – Suman Abhay Shrivastav
 Gaurav Sharma – Sunny Ashok Shrivastav
 Anjali Raghav (actress) – Sweety Ashok Shrivastav
 Sandesh Naik – Shrichand Shrivastav
 Sangeeta Panwar – Bimla Shrichand Shrivastav
 Ankita Dubey – Vibha Shrichand Shrivastav
 Neelum Gandhi – Babli Shrichand Shrivastav
 Mezbin Seikh – Neetu
 Janvi Sanghvan – Kalavati
 Sarmili Raj – Kamini
 Pramatesh Mehta – Kamal Saxena
 Leena Jumani – Mala
 Poonam Bhatia – Mishrain
 Shankar Mishra – Kishorilal
 Dipika Kakar

Awards

 Indian Television Academy Awards – Best Actress In A Negative Role – Hema Singh
 Colors Golden Petal Awards – Most Tez Taraar Personality – Hema Singh

References

External links
Kairee Official Site

Indian reality television series
Colors TV original programming
Indian television soap operas
2012 Indian television series debuts
2012 Indian television series endings